Kristoffer Ramos Barmen (born 19 August 1993) is a Norwegian professional footballer who plays as a midfielder for Aalesund.

Club career
Barmen joined Brann at the age of 10, and was sacked by the club in August 2021 after he was highlighted as playing a "key role" in the organisation of a large orgy at Brann's stadium.  Later that month he signed for Aalesund.

International career
He represented Norway U19 in the 2012 UEFA European Under-19 Football Championship qualification.

Coaching career 
In 2020, Barmen started head coaching seventh-tier amateur team Paradis IL.

Personal life 
Barmen is the son of Rolf Barmen, former chairman of SK Brann. He has also won the junior championship for quiz in Bergen.

Career statistics

References

1993 births
Living people
Footballers from Bergen
Association football midfielders
Norwegian footballers
SK Brann players
Aalesunds FK players
Eliteserien players
Norwegian First Division players
Norway youth international footballers